Geraldo Magela Delamore Moreira (born 5 April 1963 in Mariana, Minas Gerais), known as Geraldo Delamore, is a Brazilian professional football manager.

Career
In 1998-2005 he worked as a fitness coach in the Caxias, Grêmio, São Caetano and Atlético Mineiro. In 2007 first he helped train Emirati club Al Ain and then became a head coach of the club. Since 2008 until 2010 he led Brasil de Farroupilha and Sapucaiense. Until July 2013 he worked as assistant in the Corinthians. 1 January 2014 he was appointed as a head coach of the Juventude and was changed on 19 February 2014.

References

External links
 
 Profile at Soccerpunter.com
 

1963 births
Living people
Sportspeople from Minas Gerais
Brazilian football managers
Al Ain FC managers
Sociedade Esportiva Recreativa e Cultural Brasil managers
Esporte Clube Juventude managers
Cruzeiro Esporte Clube managers